{{Infobox political party
| name             = Victory Party
| native_name      = Zafer Partisi
| native_name_lang = tr
| logo             = Logo of the Victory Party (Turkey).png
| logo_size        = 100px
| colorcode        = 
| abbreviation     = ZP
| split            = Good Party
| predecessor      = 
| youth_wing       = Ayyıldız Movement
| anthem           = Kutlu Olsun ("May it be blessed")
| flag             = 
| leader           = Ümit Özdağ
| secretary_general = Cezmi Polat
| spokesperson     = Mehmet Ali Şehirlioğlu
| founder          = Ümit Özdağ
| founded          = 
| headquarters     = Ankara, Turkey
| membership       =  25,535
| membership_year  = 2023
| position         = Right-wing to far-right
| national         = Ancestral Alliance
| ideology         = 
| colours          =  Red White Grey
| seats1_title     = Grand National Assembly
| seats1           = 
| slogan           = Zafer Partisi Gelecek Sığınmacılar Gidecek ("The Victory Party Will Come, The Refugees Will Go")
| country          = Turkey
| website          = 
| seats2           = 
| seats2_title     = Municipal Assemblies
}}

The Victory Party (ZP) is a right-wing to far-right, nationalist, anti-immigrant and Kemalist political party in Turkey founded on August 26, 2021 under the leadership of Ümit Özdağ. It is currently represented in the Grand National Assembly by a single MP, Özdağ himself.

The Victory Party is the continuation of the Ayyıldız Movement'' initiated by Ümit Özdağ, which became a youth movement after the establishment of the party. The founding petition of the party was submitted to the Ministry of the Interior on 26 August 2021 and then the party was officially established.

History 

The party was founded by Ümit Özdağ, due to his many disagreements with other Turkish parties, including corruption allegaions against other parties, the general and demographic effects of the ruling AKP's refugee policies (which the Victory Paty calls "strategic immigration engineering"), the "anti-democratic approaches" by the İYİ Party, and his feuds with the MHP and the modern CHP. In Özdağ's words, it was organized under the name of Ayyıldız Movement with the aim of "forming the motto of Turkish nationalism along the lines of Atatürk" and submitted its founding petition to the Ministry of Interior on August 26, 2021, when it was officially established.

Party leader Ümit Özdağ declared Ankara mayor Mansur Yavaş as the favorite candidate of the people "based on many contacts they made" and "called him for the duty" for 2023 presidential elections, although Yavaş was a member of the CHP. Yavaş stated the declaration was without his knowledge and consent, declaring he was not at the time a candidate for presidency. Ümit Özdağ confirmed that his statement was not with the consent of the Mayor of Ankara, claiming "It would be a plot if we informed Mansur Yavaş" (against the other opposition parties).

Upon its establishment, the party had two MPs, Ümit Özdağ and İsmail Koncuk. İsmail Koncuk later rejoined the İYİ Party. The party is currently represented only by Ümit Özdağ in the parliament.

In February 2023, Muharrem İnce, the leader of the Homeland Party, announced that his party was discussing an electoral alliance with the Democratic Left Party, the Victory Party, True Party and the Justice Party for the 2023 Turkish general election. On 6 March 2023, Muharrem İnce left the 4-party alliance negotiations by sending a message to their WhatsApp group.

On 11 March 2023, the Ata Alliance was formed with Victory Party, Adalet Partisi, Ülkem Partisi and Türkiye İttifakı Partisi.

Controversies

Süleyman Soylu and Ümit Özdağ 
On May 5, 2022, Ümit Özdağ made a press statement against the Interior Minister Süleyman Soylu, who criticized him heavily in a television program, and stated that he would be in front of the Ministry of Interior building at 11:00 the next day and that he was waiting for Süleyman Soylu. Özdağ and the crowd went to the Ministry of Interior the next day, but were blocked by the police. The statements made by Özdağ in front of the Ministry and the statements he made to Soylu increased the visibility of the Zafer Party in the media.

On September 13, 2022, a banner with the inscription "domestic and national escobar" on the Victory Party's Fatih District Directorate building and a bald and halfless head image below was hung. The Prosecutor's Office quickly removed this banner, stating that it "insulted a public official". Although it was not disclosed which public official was effectively being insulted.

Leadership 
These are the board members of Victory Party:

References 

Political parties established in 2021
Politics of Turkey
Nationalist parties in Turkey
Political parties in Turkey
Right-wing populism in Turkey
Right-wing populist parties
Anti-communism in Turkey
Right-wing politics in Turkey
Right-wing parties in Europe
Far-right political parties in Turkey